Sir Stephen Jeremy Barrett  (born 4 December 1931) is a British retired diplomat who was ambassador to Czechoslovakia and Poland.

Career
Barrett was educated at Westminster School and Christ Church, Oxford. He joined the Foreign Office (later the Foreign and Commonwealth Office, FCO) in 1955 and served in Cyprus, Berlin, Helsinki, Prague and Ankara. He was briefly Principal Private Secretary to the Foreign Secretary in 1975. He was head of the British Interests Section at the Swedish Embassy in Tehran in 1981, Assistant Under-Secretary at the FCO 1981–84, Ambassador to Czechoslovakia 1985–88 and Ambassador to Poland 1988–91.

Barrett was appointed CMG in the New Year Honours of 1982 and knighted KCMG in the Queen's Birthday Honours of 1991.

Publications
Poland in transition : the return of the native, M.B. Grabowski memorial lecture, School of Slavonic and East European Studies, London, 2001 (SSEES occasional papers, no. 54)

References
BARRETT, Sir Stephen (Jeremy), Who's Who 2014, A & C Black, 2014; online edn, Oxford University Press, Dec 2013

1931 births
Living people
People educated at Westminster School, London
Alumni of Christ Church, Oxford
Principal Private Secretaries to the Secretary of State for Foreign and Commonwealth Affairs
Ambassadors of the United Kingdom to Czechoslovakia
Ambassadors of the United Kingdom to Poland
Knights Commander of the Order of St Michael and St George